Krzyżówki  is a village in the administrative district of Gmina Jeleśnia, within Żywiec County, Silesian Voivodeship, in southern Poland, near the border with Slovakia.

The village has a population of 269.

References

Villages in Żywiec County